Kioni Bay is positioned in the northeast of the Greek island of Ithaca, around the bay from the village of Kioni. Kioni village has remained relatively unspoiled by major tourist development. The village has been characterised as a 'traditional settlement' and therefore strict planning rules apply. Kioni Bay is a popular destinations for sailing boats.

Geography
The Kioni Bay is situated east of the village of Kioni.  Kioni is linked with a road going westward to Frikes and the rest of the island.  The Nirito mountains dominates the southwest.

Landforms of Ithaca
Landforms of the Ionian Islands (region)